Pacifique Plante (1907  – August 9, 1976 in Guadalajara, Mexico) was a crime fighting Montreal lawyer from the 1940s to the 1950s. He was also known as Pax Plante.

Between 1940 and 1950, he waged war against organized crime, vice and corruption in Montreal. In 1948, Plante denounced corruption inside the police force. With the assistance of the journalist Gérard Filion, he published a series of articles in Le Devoir (from November 1949 to February 1950) where he affirmed that police "protection" encouraged the activities of the underworld. With Jean Drapeau, he took part in the Caron Inquiry, which led to the arrest of several police officers.

Books about Plante
The non-fiction book City Unique by William Weintraub deals with his fight against vice in Montreal. The book has won a QSPELL Award.
Pax lutte à finir avec la pègre - Alain Stanké

References

External links
  Pax Plante affronte la pègre
 Lutte contre la pègre: la farce recommence Pax Plante, Nov. 1949 article in Le Devoir
 Le Devoir sous Gérard Filion: L'affaire Pax Plante - Qui écrira ces histoires abracadabrantes?

1907 births
1976 deaths
Lawyers from Montreal